The 2005–06 European Challenge Cup was the tenth year of the European Challenge Cup, the second tier rugby union cup competition below the Heineken Cup. The tournament was held between October 2005 and May 2006.

Group stage

Pool 1

Pool 2

Pool 3

Pool 4

Pool 5

Seeding and runners-up

Knockout stage

Quarter-finals

Semi-finals

Final

See also
European Challenge Cup
2005–06 Heineken Cup

 
2005–06 rugby union tournaments for clubs
2005-06
2005–06 in European rugby union
2005–06 in English rugby union
2005–06 in French rugby union
2005–06 in Irish rugby union
2005–06 in Italian rugby union
2005–06 in Scottish rugby union
2005–06 in Romanian rugby union